Start Art was first published in 2005 by The Artists’ Publishing Company, based in Tenterden, Kent. Issue 1 was published in the Autumn of 2005; Issues 2 and 3 were published in 2006; and Issue 4 in 2007. It is a ‘how-to’ magazine for newcomers to drawing and painting, offering guidance and encouragement. The Artists' Publishing Company also publish Leisure Painter magazine, which offers practical advice to amateur painters; and The Artist, which is aimed towards the more experienced artist.

The magazine provides information on the materials needed to start painting and drawing, along with step-by-step demonstrations to work from. Each issue is intended as a complete course of basic instruction, using drawing and coloured pencils, water-soluble pencils, watercolour, acrylics and oil pastels.  Experienced and popular tutors give guidance on how to paint landscapes, flowers, and household objects, as well as other subject matter.

External links
Official website

Visual arts magazines published in the United Kingdom
Hobby magazines published in the United Kingdom
Magazines established in 2005
Mass media in Kent